Spirou: The Robot Invasion (released in French-speaking countries as Spirou : La Panique mécanique) is a 2000 Game Boy Color game developed by Planet Interactive Development and produced by Ubisoft Entertainment Software. The game is based upon the eponymous character of the Belgian comic strip magazine Spirou, and is a follow-up to the 1996 Game Boy title of the same name.

Gameplay

 

Spirou: The Robot Invasion is a side-scrolling platformer that features 18 levels across 10 worlds, in which the player is tasked to destroy a horde of robots. The game features a comic strip presentation based on the source material, with the levels based on settings featured in the comics themselves.

Reception

Spirou: The Robot Invasion received generally positive reviews. Critics praised the visual presentation of the game, with Nick Roberts of Total Game Boy complimenting the "detailed graphics" and "bright colourful levels". 
Critics of the game disliked the difficulty of the game. Computer and Video Games stated "the one real problem is that you're forced to restart the entire level when you lose the life". Similarly, Game Boy Official Magazine stated "this odd platformer looks great and the bosses are impressive, but that's where the fun stops. Spirou is very unforgiving and you'll be back at the start if you slip up."

References

External links

2000 video games
Game Boy Color games
Game Boy Color-only games
Platform games
Single-player video games
Ubisoft games
Video games about robots
Video games based on comics
Planet Interactive Development games